Pinky Blue is the second album by British new wave band Altered Images. It was released in May 1982 and featured the hit singles "I Could Be Happy", "See Those Eyes" and "Pinky Blue".

Overview
The album reached No. 12 on the UK Albums Chart, while the singles charted well, with "I Could Be Happy" peaking at No. 7, "See Those Eyes" at No. 11 and "Pinky Blue" at No. 35 on the official singles chart. This was to be their highest placed album in the charts and was certified silver by the BPI for sales of over 60,000 copies. The style of the album moved further away from their post-punk roots and further into pop music, aided by their decision to include a cover version of Neil Diamond's MOR hit "Song Sung Blue", which was released as a fourth single only in Holland. The album was produced by Martin Rushent, who had already produced the band's successful 1981 hit single "Happy Birthday", though this would be their last project with him.

Reception for the album was mixed, bordering on negative with Melody Maker criticising the album for being overly commercial and Sounds claiming that it lacked soul. AllMusic praised the singles "I Could Be Happy" and "See Those Eyes", but added that the inclusion of "Song Sung Blue" was "a mistake."

The album was re-issued on compact disc twice in the 1990s as straight album reissues, then by Edsel Records in 2004 as Pinky Blue...Plus with added bonus tracks. The album was newly remastered and re-issued again in March 2017, this time on 180-gram black vinyl LP containing a bonus 7" single on blue vinyl. It was then released as a deluxe 2 LP edition with additional bonus tracks in May 2017. The tracks/versions from the colored 7" included with the first vinyl reissue remain exclusive to that release. The original U.S. edition of the album differed from the original UK edition by including an exclusive extended mix of the single "See Those Eyes". Other countries, such as Australia and Spain, included the band's previous hit single "Happy Birthday" as part of a re-shuffled running order on the LP.

Track listing
All tracks composed by Altered Images; except where indicated.
Side One
 "Pinky Blue" (3.10)
 "See Those Eyes" (3.10)
 "Forgotten" (2.39)
 "Little Brown Head" (2.42)
 "See You Later" (3.16)
 "Song Sung Blue" (Neil Diamond) (4.14)
Side Two
 "Funny Funny Me" (3.24)
 "Think That It Might" (2.52)
 "I Could Be Happy" (Dance Mix) (5.38)
 "Jump Jump" (3.11)
 "Goodnight and I Wish" (4.06)

CD bonus tracks (2004)
 "I Could Be Happy" (7" Version) (3.32)
 "Insects" (3.31)
 "Disco Pop Stars" (2.35)
 "Happy New Year - Real Toys" (New Version) (3.52)
 "See Those Eyes" (Dance Mix) (5.32)
 "How About That Then (I Missed My Train)" (3.24)
 "Pinky Blue" (Dance Mix) (4.57)
 "Jump Jump - Think That It Might" (Segued Dance Mix)  (6.01)

Bonus colored 7" from LP reissue (2017)
 "I Could Be Happy" (Single version)
 "Insects" (re-recorded Martin Rushent version)

Bonus LP from double vinyl reissue (2017)
Side One
 "See Those Eyes (Dance Mix)"
 "Pinky Blue (Dance Mix)"
 "Disco Pop Stars"

Side Two
 "Jump Jump - Think That It Might (Dance Mix)"
 "How About That Then (I've Missed My Train)"
 "See Those Eyes (U.S. Extended Version)"

Personnel
Altered Images
Clare Grogan - vocals
Michael "Tich" Anderson - drums
Tony McDaid - guitar
Johnny McElhone - bass
Jim McKinven - guitar
with:
John Peel, Martin Rushent - backing vocals, whistling
Technical
Martin Rushent - producer, engineer
Dave Allen - assistant engineer
David Band - direction
Eric Watson, Chris Webster, Peter Anderson - photography

References

1982 albums
Altered Images albums
Albums produced by Martin Rushent
Epic Records albums
Portrait Records albums